Giovanni Ciampitti (7 June 1877 – 22 April 1967) was an Italian politician who served as member of the Constituent Assembly (1946–1948), Senator (1948–1953) and Mayor of Isernia (1956–1958).

References

1877 births
1967 deaths
Mayors of Isernia
Senators of Legislature I of Italy
20th-century Italian politicians
Christian Democracy (Italy) politicians